Prostin may refer to:

Prostin E2, a trade name for a preparation of prostaglandin E2
Prostin VR, a trade name for a preparation of prostaglandin E1
Prostin F2 Alpha, a trade name for a preparation of prostaglandin F2alpha